The Rawhide Terror is a 1934 American Western horror film directed by Bruce M. Mitchell and Jack Nelson.

Plot summary

A gang of renegades disguised as Indians murder the parents of two brothers, as a result, the brothers separate. Ten years later, a stranger known as the Rawhide Terror begins murdering the renegades, who have now become citizens of the local town called Red Dog. As the town frantically attempts to track down the killer, the destinies of the two brothers draw closer together and the identity of the killer is soon revealed.

Cast
 Art Mix as Al, a Blake ranch hand
 Edmund Cobb as Sheriff
 William Desmond as Tom Blake, Betty's older brother
 William Barrymore as Brent
 Frances Morris as Betty Blake
 George Holt as Renegade leader
 Bill Patton as Renegade
 Herman Hack as Deputy Hack
 Tommy Bupp as Jimmy Brent
 Fred Parker as Pappy / Banker

Production
The Rawhide Terror was the final screen collaboration between Victor Adamson and George Kesterson (under his stage name Art Mix), the latter of whom Adamson's company was named after. Originally envisioned as a movie serial titled The Pueblo Terror, it was later cut from its original 52 minute length and converted into a 46–47 minute feature film when funding for the film fell through.  In spite of this, the film has been incorrectly listed under its original 52 minute runtime.

Release

Home media
The film was released on DVD by Image Entertainment as a part of its "Creepy Cowboys: Four Weird Westerns" film pack on April 25, 2006. It was later released by Alpha Video on January 31, 2011.

Reception

The Rawhide Terror has received no attention from mainstream critics. Reviews that exist on the film have been mostly negative, with many calling the film "sloppy" and "crudely made".
Author Michael R. Pitts criticized the film, calling it "a failed experiment in the mixing of two fairly distinct genres", and criticized the film's poor cinematography, and lack of plot continuity.
Hans J. Wollstein from Allmovie called it "convincingly eerie, in no small measure due to a potent performance by the mystery killer". Max Sparber from Wildest West.com awarded the film 1/5 stars, writing, "A Poverty Row Western about a weird, revenging figure with a rawhide strap across his face, made by filmmakers who seemed to understand the pleasures of pulp fiction without having any idea how to put it on the screen."

References
Bibliography

Notes

External links
 
 
 
 
 

1934 films
1930s Western (genre) horror films
American black-and-white films
American Western (genre) horror films
1930s English-language films
Films directed by Jack Nelson
1930s American films
1934 horror films